William John Phillips MC (20 July 1914 – 11 May 1995) was an English actor. He is known for the role of Chief Superintendent Robins in the television series Z-Cars and for his work as a Shakespearean stage actor.

Early life
Phillips was born in Birmingham, Warwickshire in 1914, was educated at Oswestry and began his acting career at Birmingham Rep in the 1930s. During the Second World War, Phillips served in the Royal Warwickshire Regiment and was awarded the Military Cross.

Career

Stage
His early theatre roles included the Ghost in the 1955 Peter Brook – Paul Scofield production of Hamlet at the Phoenix Theatre; the American Ambassador in Peter Ustinov's 1957 production of Romanoff and Juliet; and Prospero in the 1959 production of John Dryden and William Davenant's version of The Tempest, at the Old Vic. Phillips continued to work as a stage actor until his retirement in the 1980s.

Television
Phillips appeared in a number of television roles, which included: Danger Man (1962), Lieutenant Colonel John Whitley in Frontier (1968), Jack Frazer in The Onedin Line (1972–76), Grand Duke Nicholas in Fall of Eagles (1974), Josiah Wedgewood in Days of Hope (1975), Naso in Jesus of Nazareth (1977) and Dr Charles Langley-Beard in The Old Men at the Zoo (1983). His role as Chief Superintendent Robins (1962–78) in Z-Cars and Softly, Softly was perhaps his most memorable.

Death
Phillips died in Oswestry, Shropshire on 11 May 1995.

Selected filmography

1938: The Wooing of Anne Hathaway (TV Movie)
1952: Angels One Five .... Engineer Officer
1954: The Monkey's Paw (TV Short) .... Sergeant-Major Morris
1955: Noah Gives Thanks (TV Movie) .... Mr. Pebble, Vicar of Crockitt
1955: The Dark Avenger .... Second French Knight
1955: Richard III .... Norfolk
1955: The Vise (TV Series) .... Philip Twyford (uncredited)
1955-1959 BBC Sunday-Night Theatre (TV Series) .... Jacob Dillon / Colonel Davies / Escales / Chorus
1956: Women Without Men .... Male Guard at Gate (uncredited)
1956: Passport to Treason .... Police Driver (uncredited)
1956: The Count of Monte Cristo (TV Series) .... Major Du Valle
1956: The Black Tulip (TV Series) .... John de Witte
1956: Theatre Royal (TV Series)
1957: The Adventures of Peter Simple (TV Series) .... Captain Savage, RN
1957: Theatre Night (TV Series) .... Hooper Moulsworth
1957: Fortune Is a Woman .... Willis Croft
1957: The Shiralee .... Doctor
1957-1965: ITV Play of the Week (TV Series) .... John Anthony / Prime Minister / Mr. Smith / John Graham Whitfield / Cromwell / Professor Robert Linden / Judge Gaunt / General von Sauberzweig / Anthony Folland / David Crampton / Mr. Friday
1958: Television World Theatre (TV Series) .... The Mayor / Count Peter Zichy
1958: I Accuse! .... Prosecutor - Esterhazy Trial
1958: Doomsday for Dyson (TV Movie) .... General Schalz
1958: Dunkirk .... Boat Owner Spokesman (uncredited)
1958: Floods of Fear .... Dr. Matthews
1959: Bleak House (TV Mini-Series) .... Mr. Tulkinghorn
1960: Saturday Playhouse (TV Series) .... Jeffrey Bellenger
1960: Somerset Maugham Hour (TV Series) .... Jeffrey Bellenger
1960: Village of the Damned .... General Leighton
1960: Follow That Horse! .... American Delegate (uncredited)
1960: Man in the Moon .... Professor Stephens
1960-1961: Danger Man (TV Series) .... Coyannis / Paul
1961: Romanoff and Juliet .... Hooper Moulsworth
1961: One Step Beyond (TV Series) .... Frank
1961: Offbeat
1961: The Roman Spring of Mrs. Stone .... Tom Stone
1961-1962: BBC Sunday-Night Play (TV Series) .... Trifonov / Prince Galitzin
1962: Under Western Eyes (TV Movie) .... Ivanovich
1962: Suspense (TV Series) .... Luther Ross
1962: The Hatchet Man (TV Movie) .... George Curnic, head of studio
1962: Saki (TV Series) .... Duncan Dullamy
1962: Man of the World (TV Series) .... General Montreaux
1962: A Prize of Arms .... Col. Fowler
1962: We Joined the Navy .... Rear Admiral
1962: Thirty-Minute Theatre (TV Series)
1962-1978: Z Cars (TV Series) .... Asst. Chief Constable Robins
1963: The Mouse on the Moon .... Bracewell - U.S. Delegate
1963: First Night (TV Series) .... Gideon Cobb
1963: The Sentimental Agent (TV Series) .... Henry Peabody Sr.
1964: Becket .... Bishop of Winchester
1964: Armchair Theatre (TV Series) .... George
1964: Rupert of Hentzau (TV Series) .... Colonel Zapt
1964: Smuggler's Bay (TV Series) .... Elzevir Block
1964-1966: Sergeant Cork (TV Series) .... Col. Haverlock / Big Ben Lewis
1965: Alexander Graham Bell (TV Series) .... Professor Bell
1965: Legend of Death (TV Series) .... Edward Gargan
1965: Knock on Any Door (TV Series) .... Robert Prettyman
1965: Danger Man (TV Series) .... Dr. Brajanska
1965: Joey Boy .... Insp. Morgan
1965-1968: Theatre 625 (TV Series) .... Clifford Dyke / Alfred Truelove
1965-1968: The Wednesday Play (TV Series) .... Councillor Percival / Sir Gilbert Hardacre / Cardinal Runan / Forbes-Wainwright
1966: BBC Play of the Month (TV Series) .... Major General Atkins
1966: Mystery and Imagination (TV Series) .... Colonel Gaillarde
1966-1967: Dixon of Dock Green (TV Series) .... Magistrate / Mr. Parry
1967: The Avengers (TV Series) .... Nesbitt
1967: The Mummy's Shroud .... Stanley Preston
1967: Thirty-Minute Theatre (TV Series) .... Mr. Tredgold
1967: The Forsyte Saga (TV Series) .... Sir Alexander MacGown
1967: This Way for Murder (TV Mini-Series) .... Barnton
1967: Out of Town Theatre (TV Mini-Series) .... Sir Howard Price
1967: Torture Garden .... Eddie Storm (segment 2 "Terror Over Hollywood")
1968: Softly, Softly (TV Series) .... Det. Chief Supt. Robins
1968: Frontier (TV Series) .... Lt. Col. Whitley
1968: The Caesars (TV Mini-Series) .... Piso
1969: W. Somerset Maugham (TV Series) .... Commandant
1969: Christ Recrucified (TV Mini-Series) .... Pope Grigoris
1969: Who-Dun-It (TV Series) .... Det. Insp. Hollis
1970: Manhunt (TV Series) .... Klintzch
1970: Doctor in the House (TV Series) .... Sir Hartley Maynard
1970: Confession (TV Series) .... Headmaster
1970: The Black Tulip (TV Mini-Series) .... Cornelius de Witt
1970: The Main Chance (TV Series) .... Arnold Bingley
1970: Horizon (TV Series documentary) .... Mr. Bidder
1970-1972: Crime of Passion (TV Series) .... Maître Lacan
1970-1980: Play for Today (TV Series) .... Examining judge / Rev. Howard Whithead - Anglican Vicar
1971: The Persuaders (TV Series) .... Lanning Koestler
1972: Man of Straw (TV Mini-Series) .... Dr. Heuteufel
1972-1976: The Onedin Line (TV Series) .... Jack Frazer
1973: The Rivals of Sherlock Holmes (TV Series) .... Professor Dyne
1973: Jane Eyre (TV Mini-Series) .... Mr. Brocklehurst
1973: Wipers Three (TV Movie) .... Admiral Sir John Jellicoe
1974: John Halifax, Gentleman (TV Mini-Series) .... Abel Fletcher
1974: Fall of Eagles (TV Mini-Series) .... Grand Duke Nicholas
1974: The Pallisers (TV Mini-Series) .... Sir Gregory Grogram
1974: Father Brown (TV Series) .... Brander Merton
1975: Days of Hope (TV Mini-Series) .... Josiah Wedgwood
1975 Quiller (TV Series) .... Henry Tulliver
1976: The Flight of the Heron (TV Series) .... Cameron of Lochiel
1977: Jesus of Nazareth (TV Mini-Series) .... Naso
1977: Mr. Big (TV Series) .... Leopold Ruchworth
1977: Ripping Yarns (TV Series) .... Colonel Harcourt Badger Owen
1977: 1990 (TV Series) .... Attorney General Graham
1977: Three Dangerous Ladies .... Urcombe (segment "Mrs. Amworth")
1978 Hazell (TV Series) .... Det. Supt. Bull
1978: Mrs. Amworth (Short) .... Francis Urcombe
1978: Lillie (TV Mini-Series) .... W. E. Gladstone
1979: Quadrophenia .... Magistrate
1983: Ascendancy .... Wintour
1983: The Old Men at the Zoo (TV Series) .... Dr. Charles Langley-Beard
1984: Strangers and Brothers (TV Series) .... Reggie Collingwood
1985: TV Eye (TV Series) .... Committee Member
1987: One by One (TV Series) .... Ben Friedhofer
1991: Merlin of the Crystal Cave (TV Series)
1992: Leon the Pig Farmer .... Trevor (final film role)

References

External links
 
 Obituary: The Independent

1914 births
1995 deaths
Male actors from Birmingham, West Midlands
English male stage actors
English male television actors
English male film actors
English male Shakespearean actors
Royal Warwickshire Fusiliers officers
British Army personnel of World War II
Recipients of the Military Cross
20th-century English male actors